Platycephalisca is a genus of frit flies in the family Chloropidae. There are at least three described species in Platycephalisca.

Species
These three species belong to the genus Platycephalisca:
 Platycephalisca amurensis Nartshuk, 1963 c g
 Platycephalisca australica Spencer, 1986 c g
 Platycephalisca novaeguineae Ismay, 1995 c g
Data sources: i = ITIS, c = Catalogue of Life, g = GBIF, b = Bugguide.net

References

Further reading

External links

 

Chloropinae
Chloropidae genera